Rico Benatelli (born 17 March 1992) is a German professional footballer who plays as an attacking midfielder for Austrian club Austria Klagenfurt.

Club career
Born in Herdecke and raised in Bochum, Benatelli went through the youth ranks of local heavyweights VfL Bochum. Still during his youth career he moved to Borussia Dortmund where he stayed for five years, playing two years senior football for the club's reserve team in fourth and third tier. 

In July 2015, after Erzgebirge Aue had been relegated from 2. Bundesliga, he joined newly promoted fellow 3. Liga side Würzburger Kickers on a free transfer, signing a two-year-contract until 2017.

On 28 July 2022, Benatelli signed a two-year contract with Austria Klagenfurt in Austria.

Personal life
He is the son of former professional footballer Frank Benatelli. Rico is of Italian descent.

Career statistics

References

External links

1992 births
Living people
German people of Italian descent
Association football midfielders
German footballers
Borussia Dortmund II players
FC Erzgebirge Aue players
Würzburger Kickers players
Dynamo Dresden players
FC St. Pauli players
FC St. Pauli II players
SK Austria Klagenfurt players
2. Bundesliga players
3. Liga players
Regionalliga players
People from Herdecke
Sportspeople from Arnsberg (region)
Footballers from North Rhine-Westphalia
German expatriate footballers
Expatriate footballers in Austria
German expatriate sportspeople in Austria